The 1943 Chicago White Sox season was the White Sox's 43rd season in the major leagues, and their 44th season overall. They finished with a record of 82–72, good enough for 4th place in the American League, 16 games behind the first place New York Yankees. The White Sox played a record 44 doubleheaders over the course of the season.

Regular season

Season standings

Record vs. opponents

Opening Day lineup 
 Thurman Tucker, CF
 Luke Appling, SS
 Joe Kuhel, 1B
 Moose Solters, LF
 Don Kolloway, 2B
 Wally Moses, RF
 Jimmy Grant, 3B
 Mike Tresh, C
 Bill Dietrich, P

Roster

Player stats

Batting 
Note: G = Games played; AB = At bats; R = Runs scored; H = Hits; 2B = Doubles; 3B = Triples; HR = Home runs; RBI = Runs batted in; BB = Base on balls; SO = Strikeouts; AVG = Batting average; SB = Stolen bases

Pitching 
Note: W = Wins; L = Losses; ERA = Earned run average; G = Games pitched; GS = Games started; SV = Saves; IP = Innings pitched; H = Hits allowed; R = Runs allowed; ER = Earned runs allowed; HR = Home runs allowed; BB = Walks allowed; K = Strikeouts

References

External links 
 1943 Chicago White Sox at Baseball Reference

Chicago White Sox seasons
Chicago White Sox season
Chicago White Sox